Gerhard Dammann (30 March 1883 – 21 February 1946) was a German film actor.

Selected filmography

 The Man in the Cellar (1914)
 Under the Lantern (1928)
 Eva in Silk (1928)
 Lemke's Widow (1928)
 When the Mother and the Daughter (1928)
 The Strange Night of Helga Wangen (1928)
 Death Drive for the World Record (1929)
 Children of the Street (1929)
 Zwei Brüder (1929)
 Woman in the Moon (1929)
 Roses Bloom on the Moorland (1929)
 Sin and Morality (1929)
 Giftgas (1929)
 Masks (1929)
 Painted Youth (1929)
 The Cabinet of Doctor Larifari (1930)
 Rag Ball (1930)
 Marriage Strike (1930)
 My Leopold (1931)
 Grock (1931)
 Without Meyer, No Celebration is Complete (1931)
 Marriage with Limited Liability (1931)
 Different Morals (1931)
 Crime Reporter Holm (1932)
 Between Night and Dawn (1931)
 A Crafty Youth (1931)
 Bobby Gets Going (1931)
 Emil and the Detectives (1931)
 Spione im Savoy-Hotel (1932)
 The Escape to Nice (1932)
 The Importance of Being Earnest (1932)
 Gitta Discovers Her Heart (1932)
 The Heath Is Green (1932)
 Johnny Steals Europe (1932)
 No Money Needed (1932)
 Secret Agent (1932)
 Secret of the Blue Room (1932)
 The Blue of Heaven (1932)
 Maid Happy (1933)
 Love Must Be Understood (1933)
 Tell Me Who You Are (1933)
 The Big Bluff (1933)
 Three Bluejackets and a Blonde (1933)
 Elisabeth and the Fool (1934)
 Miss Liselott (1934)
 Black Fighter Johanna (1934)
 The Daring Swimmer (1934)
 The World Without a Mask (1934)
 Bashful Felix (1934)
 Don't Lose Heart, Suzanne! (1935)
 The King's Prisoner (1935)
 The Valley of Love (1935)
 Variety (1935)
 The Impossible Woman (1936)
 The Castle in Flanders (1936)
 Hilde and the Volkswagen (1936)
 The Accusing Song (1936)
 Orders Are Orders (1936)
 Paul and Pauline (1936)
 Autobus S (1937)
 Woman's Love—Woman's Suffering (1937)
 The Ways of Love Are Strange (1937)
 His Best Friend (1937)
 Love Can Lie (1937)
 Madame Bovary (1937)
 The Man Who Was Sherlock Holmes (1937)
 The Divine Jetta (1937)
 Storms in May (1938)
 Men, Animals and Sensations (1938)
 The Impossible Mister Pitt (1938)
 Monika (1938)
 You and I (1938)
 The Tiger of Eschnapur (1938)
 The Indian Tomb (1938)
 Steputat & Co. (1938)
 Escape in the Dark (1939)
 In the Name of the People (1939)
 Bachelor's Paradise (1939)
 Marriage in Small Doses (1939)
 Robert and Bertram (1939)
 The Girl at the Reception (1940)
 A Man Astray (1940)
 Twilight (1940)
 Clarissa (1941)
 Riding for Germany (1941)
 Above All Else in the World (1941)
 Diesel (1942)
 Front Theatre (1942)
 Two in a Big City (1942)
 Wedding in Barenhof (1942)
 Zirkus Renz (1943)
 Melody of a Great City (1943)
 The Golden Spider (1943)
 The Green Salon (1944)

Bibliography
 Abel, Richard. Encyclopedia of Early Cinema. Taylor & Francis, 2005.

External links

1883 births
1946 deaths
German male film actors
German male silent film actors
Actors from Cologne
20th-century German male actors